Łukasz Czapla (born 8 December 1982) is a Polish sport shooter, a four-time world champion and former holder of the world record in 10 metre running target mixed. He holds all four Polish running target records, three of them higher than the world records.

Czapla won 50 metre running target, 50 metre running target mixed and 10 metre running target mixed at the 2006 ISSF World Shooting Championships, and successfully defended the 10 metre mixed title at the 2008 World Running Target Championships.

External links
Official website

1982 births
Living people
Polish male sport shooters
Running target shooters
Sportspeople from Kraków
21st-century Polish people